WNHT may refer to:

 WNHT-LD, a low-power television station (channel 4) licensed to Alabaster, Alabama, United States
 WNHT (TV), a former CBS affiliate in Concord, New Hampshire, now WPXG (UHF 21)
 WXKE, a radio station (96.3 FM) licensed to Churubusco, Indiana, United States, which held the call sign WNHT from 2002 to 2014
 WXXS, a radio station (102.3 FM) licensed to Lancaster, New Hampshire, United States, which held the call sign WNHT from 1997 to 1998